Life Mein Twist Hai is a 2014 Hindi language Indian directed by Dinesh Soni. The film stars Sahil Akhtar, Michelle Shah and Arshi Suryavanshi. It was released on 12 December 2014.

Cast 
 Sahil Akhtar.... Sagar
 Michelle Shah.... Anita
 Archana Singh.... Sheetal
 Shahir khan
Govind Mishra.... Sagar
 Aditiya  Shrivastav ( Chandan)
 Vaibhivi Joshi
Heena Panchal...Item number "Balam Bambai″

Songs

References

External links

2014 films
2010s Hindi-language films
Indian mystery films